Elections to the Manipur Legislative Assembly were held in February 1974 to elect members of the 60 constituencies in Manipur, India. The Indian National Congress won the popular vote, but the Manipur Peoples Party won the most seats and its leader Mohammed Alimuddin was reappointed as the Chief Minister of Manipur.

After the passing of the North-Eastern Areas (Reorganisation) Act, 1971, Manipur was converted from a Union Territory to a State and the size of its Legislative Assembly was increased from 30 to 60 members.

Result

Elected Members

See also 
 List of constituencies of the Manipur Legislative Assembly
 1974 elections in India

References

Manipur
1974
1974